is a Japanese manga series written and illustrated by Yasunori Mitsunaga. The manga was serialized in Monthly Shōnen Sirius magazine and published by Kodansha. A 26-episode anime series by Madhouse aired on TBS in 2007. Both the manga and anime are available in North America with the manga licensed by Del Rey Manga and the anime licensed by Sentai Filmworks and available on the Anime Network website. A new OVA series has been made by Tatsunoko Productions with the first episode released in December 2010, along with the 13th volume of the manga, the second episode for the 14th volume, and the third episode for the 16th volume. A spin-off manga, Naqua-Den, which stars a side character from Princess Resurrection as the main character, was released in 2012. On 25 November 2017, a new manga, titled Princess Resurrection Nightmare, was released.

Plot

Hiro Hiyorimi is a boy who's just moved to "Sasanaki Village" to meet his sister whose recently been employed by a mysterious young woman that prefers to be called "Hime". Hiro encounters Hime by chance when she and her short yet strong gynoid bodyguard, Flandre arrive; sacrificing himself to push Hime out of the way of a speeding car (in the anime it's falling construction beams). However, Hiro suddenly finds himself alive, initially confused as he encounters Hime and unconsciously defends her during her fight with a werewolf. Hime explains that she is a member of the royal family of the Monster Realm which co-exists with the Earth-Realm, revealing her family possess the power to temporary revive the dead as half-immortals bound to serve and protect them. Despite her disinterest, Hime is caught in a war of succession among her siblings for the Monster Kingdom's throne. The story then follows Hiro helping Hime fend off her siblings' supernatural assassins as they're joined by a half-werewolf named Riza and the vampire Reiri, Hime's younger sister, Sherwood and her android bodyguard, Francisca as their neighbors.

Media

Manga
Originally released in Japanese by Kodansha, Princess Resurrection has been released in English by Kodansha USA (formerly, Del Rey Manga), in French by Pika Edition, and in German by Egmont.

Volume list

Anime

A 26-episode anime directed by Masayuki Sakoi and Madhouse aired on TBS, BS-i, KBS Kyoto and its affiliated TV networks from 12 April 2007 to 28 September 2007. Unlike the manga, the anime is less violent and the gore has been toned down. The Opening Theme song was "BLOOD QUEEN" by Aki Misato and the Ending Theme song was "Bow Down and Lick My Feet" (跪いて足をお嘗め, hizamazuite ashi wo oname) by Ali Project.

Original soundtrack
Princess Resurrection OST - Sympathy for the Belonephobia (怪物王女 オリジナル・サウンドトラック Sympathy for the Belonephobia) is the official soundtrack of the anime television series Princess Resurrection, was released on 3 October 2007. With the exception of the opening theme song Blood Queen, each song was produced by a member of Ali Project.

Track list
Note: Most of the track titles are in romaji.

 Oumagakoi (Bloody Baptisma)
 
 Jigoku no Kyuuketsu Parade
 Chi Nure Yajuu Bukyoku
 Saturnus no Sangeki
 Butou Kumo Midnight
 Insomnia no Yume Guillotine
 Outeki Ketsuzoku (vocal)
 Bokusatsu Rock
 Houmagakoi (Hieronymusic Vibration)
 Belonephobia ni Sasageru Ballad
 
 Tokeijikake no Seibozou
 Hakai Conductor
 Igyou no Sadame
 Kichiku Odoru Fukaki Mori
 Belonephobia no Bansankai
 Rouzaiku no Ragtime
 Hisamazuite Ashi o o-Name (Strings Arranged)
 Oumagakoi (vocal)
 Kizuguchi ni Hasami o Tatete
 Saraba Itoshiki Chainsaw
 Owari naki Sousoukyoku
 Tenshi Ronsha no Serenade
 Tou Hikari, Aru wa Sono Hoteri
 Kakusei Beronephobia
 666 Banme no Genzai
 Shukumei ni Aragaishi Mono
 Zenmetsu Hakaba Yori Ai wo Komete
 Blood Queen (TV Size) / Aki Misato
 Hisamazuite Ashi o o-Name (TV Size)

Reception

In Jason Thompson's online appendix to Manga: The Complete Guide, he describes the series' plot as being "fun and fast-paced", with "imaginative" action scenes. He also appreciated the manga's references to "classic movie monsters".

See also
Avarth, another manga series by the same author
Isekai Sniper wa Onna Senshi no Mofumofu Pet, another manga series by the same author
Time Stop Hero, another manga series by the same author

References

Further reading

External links
 Kodansha's page on the series 
 TBS's official website for the anime 
 Madhouse's official website 
 Kodansha's Official Releases 
 

2007 Japanese television series endings
2007 anime television series debuts
2010 anime OVAs
2013 comics endings
Anime and manga about werewolves
Dark comedy anime and manga
Dark fantasy anime and manga
Kodansha manga
Madhouse (company)
Sentai Filmworks
Shōnen manga
TBS Television (Japan) original programming
Vampires in animated film
Vampires in anime and manga